Kingston upon Hull West was a borough constituency in Kingston upon Hull which returned one Member of Parliament (MP) to the House of Commons of the Parliament of the United Kingdom from 1885 until it was abolished for the 1918 general election.

It was recreated for the 1955 general election and abolished again for the 1997 general election.  It was then replaced by the new Hull West and Hessle constituency.

History

Boundaries 
1885–1918: The Municipal Borough of Kingston-upon-Hull wards of Albert, Botanic, Coltman, Newington, and Park.

1955–1974: The County Borough of Kingston-upon-Hull wards of Albert, Coltman, North Newington, Pickering, St Andrew's, and South Newington.

1974–1983: The County Borough of Kingston-upon-Hull wards of Boothferry, Coltman, Derringham, Newington, Pickering, and St Andrew's.

1983–1997:  The City of Hull wards of Boothferry, Derringham, Myton, Newington, Pickering, and St Andrew's.

Members of Parliament

MPs 1885–1918

MPs 1955–1997

Elections

Elections in the 1880s

Elections in the 1890s

Elections in the 1900s

Elections in the 1910s 

General election 1914–15:

Another general election was required to take place before the end of 1915. The political parties had been making preparations for an election to take place and by July 1914, the following candidates had been selected; 
Labour: Alfred Gould
Liberal: Guy Wilson
National Sailors' and Firemen's Union: John R. Bell
Unionist: W. H. Grace

Elections in the 1950s

Elections in the 1960s

Elections in the 1970s

Elections in the 1980s

Election in the 1990s

Notes and references 

Parliamentary constituencies in Yorkshire and the Humber (historic)
Constituencies of the Parliament of the United Kingdom established in 1885
Constituencies of the Parliament of the United Kingdom disestablished in 1918
Constituencies of the Parliament of the United Kingdom established in 1955
Constituencies of the Parliament of the United Kingdom disestablished in 1997
History of Kingston upon Hull
Politics of Kingston upon Hull